Cordelia is a given name, most notably referring to: 

 Cordelia (King Lear), a character in Shakespeare's play King Lear

Cordelia may also refer to:

Arts and entertainment
Cordélia (film), a 1980 Canadian film directed by Jean Beaudin
 Monte Carlo (2011 film), an American adventure rom-com 
Cordelia (2019 film), a British film starring  Michael Gambon
Cordelia (novel), a 1949 novel by Winston Graham
 Cordelia, a comics series by Ilah
"Cordelia", a song by the Tragically Hip from Road Apples, 1991

Places
Cordelia, Queensland, Australia
Cordelia, California, US
Cordelia, Ohio, US
Cordelia Township, Bottineau County, North Dakota, US
Cordelia Lutheran Church, on the US National Register of Historic Places in Latah County, Idaho
Cordelia (moon), a moon of Uranus
2758 Cordelia, an asteroid

Other uses
Cordelia (butterfly), a genus of butterflies
HMS Cordelia, four ships of the Royal Navy